Marine Heavy Helicopter Squadron 462 (HMH-462) is a United States Marine Corps helicopter squadron operating CH-53E Super Stallion  heavy transport helicopters. The squadron, known as the "Heavy Haulers", is based at Marine Corps Air Station Miramar, California and falls under the command of Marine Aircraft Group 16 (MAG-16) and the 3rd Marine Aircraft Wing (3rd MAW).

History

World War II

Marine Fighting Squadron 462 (VMF-462) was activated Marine Corps Air Station El Centro, California on April 15, 1944.  On October 10, 1944 the squadron absorbed personnel and equipment from VMF-481 and they were redesignated a fighter pilot replacement training unit.  The unit flew the Vought F4U-1 Corsair during this time.  Shortly thereafter they transferred to Marine Corps Air Station El Toro, California and remained there until the end of the war.  The squadron was quickly deactivated after the war's end on September 10, 1945.

1950s and early 1960s

On November 1, 1957, 462 was reactivated at Marine Corps Air Facility Santa Ana, California as Marine Helicopter Transport Squadron (Medium) 462 HMR(M)-462. In March 1958 the squadron received the Sikorsky HR2S-1(CH-37 Mojave), known as the "Deuce."  In July 1958 the squadron participated in NASA’s abort recovery tests of the Mercury space capsule in the Salton Sea. During July 1959 HMR(M)-462 worked with the United States Army in El Paso, Texas to conduct the initial aerial transport tests of the Hawk missile system. One year later, the squadron worked with Convair Astronautics Corporation in San Diego to help construct Atlas missile silos. Also during 1960, HMR(M)-462 joined with the Federal Aviation Administration, Sikorsky Aircraft, the U.S. Army, New York Airways and British technical representatives of the Decca Corporation to establish Instrument Flight Procedures for helicopters.  In June 1965 the squadron was once again decommissioned and placed in a cadre status as the Marine Corps awaited the arrival of the CH-53A "Sea Stallion."

Vietnam War

In August 1968, under the command of LtCol R.E. Nelson, the squadron deployed to South Vietnam for combat operations. Assigned to Marine Aircraft Group 36 at Phu Bai Combat Base, the squadron was tasked with supporting the 3rd Marine Division resupplying outlying Fire Support Bases (FSBs) and Helicopter Landing Zones (LZs), troop transport, medical evacuation, tactical aircraft recovery (TAR), Command and Control flights (C&C), and reconnaissance team insert/extracts. The squadron additionally provided support to US Army units also attached to the 3rd Marine Division including 1st Brigade, 5th Infantry Division and the Army of the Republic of Vietnam (ARVN) 1st and 2nd Regiments.

Its primary area of operation was the northern I Corps Tactical Zone (ICTZ), the two northernmost Provinces of South Vietnam: Quảng Trị and Thừa Thiên, bordering the Vietnamese Demilitarized Zone (DMZ) on the north and the Laotian border to the west. However during mid-late 1969, HMH-462 was tasked with supporting the 1st Marine Division, in Quảng Nam and Quảng Tín Province; and the South Korean 2nd Marine Brigade on search and destroy operations in the vicinity of Go Noi Island and LZ-211, south of Da Nang, in Operation Victory Dragon.

The squadron participated in numerous named operations including: Meade River, Taylor Common, Dawson River, Dewey Canyon, Purple Martin, Maine Crag, Apache Snow, Cameron Falls, Herkimer Mountain, Utah Mesa (USMC/USA), Virginia Ridge, Georgia Tar, Arlington Canyon, Idaho Canyon, Ellis Ravine (USA), Massachusetts Bay (USA), Iroquois Grove (USA), Williams Glade (USMC/USA), Durham Peak, Pipestone Canyon and a series of ROK Marine operations, "Victory Dragon"

In 1975 HMH-462, still stationed in Okinawa, was assigned to the 9th MAB and 31st Marine Expeditionary Unit. Seventeen days later from 29–30 April, HMH-462 participated in Operation Frequent Wind, the evacuation of Saigon. The Mayaguez rescue was completed before the Hancock arrived on station and the Hancock returned to Subic Bay.

Post Vietnam and the 1990s

After nearly ten years of continuous overseas service, HMH-462 was relocated to Marine Corps Air Station Tustin, California and assigned to Marine Aircraft Group 16. They also participated in the Unit Deployment Program to MCAS Futenma, Okinawa,  In December 1989, a squadron detachment was assigned to participate in coup contingency operations in the Republic of the Philippines as part of Marine Aircraft Group 90.

In August 1990, the "Heavy Haulers" were assigned to Marine Aircraft Group 70 and deployed to Jubail, Saudi Arabia as part transport, MEDEVAC, VIP, and FARP support to MAG-70/16 and I Marine Expeditionary Force  operations.

In February 1991, the squadron relocated to Tanajib, Saudi Arabia, where it provided support for Operation Desert Storm. Following the conclusion of hostilities, the squadron returned to MCAS Tustin. During March 1991, the squadron received the 1990 Chief of Naval Operations Safety Award.  In September, the squadron reached another milestone when it completed 15,000 class A mishap free flight hours.

In 1992 it was also announced that HMH-462 had been selected for transition to the CH-53E Super Stallion. In June, the Heavy Haulers took possession of their first CH-53E Super Stallion and began the transition process.

In 1996, the squadron reached another milestone when it completed 28,000 class A mishap free flight hours. In May of the same year, after completing another unit deployment to Okinawa, Japan.  The "Heavy Haulers" received the Heavy Helicopter Squadron of the Year Award from the Marine Corps Aviation Association for 1996.

In March 1997, HMH-462 surpassed 30,000 class A mishap free flight hours. After returning home in May 1998 from another unit deployment cycle. They became the first helicopter squadron in MAG-16 to make the transition from Tustin to MCAS Miramar, California. In December of the same year, HMH-462 surpassed yet another class A mishap free flight hour milestone of 35,000 hours and received the Heavy Helicopter Squadron of the Year award for 1998.

The Global War on Terror

HMH 462 served in Operation Iraqi Freedom from February 2003 to October 2003 and Operation Enduring Freedom from September 2004 to May 2005. They flew many missions supporting logistics and combat missions involving insertion and extraction of special forces groups.

Proposed Deactivation

Commandant Gen. David Berger released a news statement on the future of the USMC. In it he states that, "Developing a force that incorporates emerging technologies and a significant change to force structure within our current resource constraints will require the Marine Corps to become smaller and remove legacy capabilities." 
As part of this significant change to force structure, in May 2020 the USMC reorganization plan proposed the squadron to be deactivated in 2022.  However the proposed reorganization plan was changed to deactivate HMH-463 at MCAS Kaneohe Bay after a detailed cost analysis provided by HQMC Aviation.

See also

 United States Marine Corps Aviation
 Organization of the United States Marine Corps
 List of active United States Marine Corps aircraft squadrons

References

Citations

Bibliography

External links

 
Squadron's unofficial website 

H462